Raadi-Kruusamäe, or Raadi for short, is a neighbourhood of Tartu, Estonia. Raadi is mainly suburban area.

The name Raadi comes from Raadi Manor, which belonged to the town council (Rat) of Tartu in medieval times. The Manor was first mentioned on a card in 1688. The manor housed the Estonian National Museum 1922–1944, but was heavily damaged in World War II due to the bombings from Soviet Army. New building for the museum was opened in 2016 and the Manor is currently in ruins, but it has been suggested to move Tartu Art Museum to the restored Manor building.

In 2020, estimated 200,000 solar panels will be built on Raadi Airfield, making it the biggest solar farm in Estonia.

Main sights 
Main sights of Raadi include Estonian National Museum,  Raadi Manor complex, Raadi cemetery, Tartu Upside Down House, Tartu Adventure Park, Kobraste and Ülejõe Beach.

Punk festival  has been hosted annually at the Lake Raadi since 2012. Tartu Midsummer is hosted at the Raadi Manor complex.

Nature 
Four out of six nature reserves of Tartu are located in Raadi. These include Raadi Park, Aruküla caves, Devonian sandstone outcrop and Pseudotsuga parkway in the Raadi cemetery.

Business and industry 
 manufacturing buildings are located in Raadi.

Gallery

See also
Raadi cemetery
Raadi Manor
Lake Raadi
Raadi Airfield
Estonian National Museum

References

Tartu